Mountain Vista High School is a public high school located in Highlands Ranch, Colorado. It is part of the Douglas County School District.

History 
Initially designated "High School No. 6" in the school district's long-range plans, Mountain Vista High School was named such in 2000. The original mascot for the school was set to be the “Sun Devils” with the colors of red and yellow. However, due to widespread protest by local Christian activists, the mascot was shortly changed to the “Golden Eagle” with the colors of green and gold. The school opened in August 2001 with 350 students and saw its first graduating class in 2005.

Extracurricular activities

Athletics 
Mountain Vista competes in 5A athletics. The school also maintains a combined rugby union team with local Thunder Ridge High School, Highlands Ranch High School, and Rock Canyon High School.

In 2005, Mountain Vista girls' soccer team defeated Arapahoe High School for the 5A state title.  They took state again in 2011.

In 2010, the field hockey team won the 5A state championship, beating Kent Denver 1-0.

The men's cross country team won the Colorado 5A State Cross Country Championships 4 consecutive years, from 2012 to 2015.

The men's swim and dive team, combined with Thunder Ridge, Rock Canyon, and Highlands Ranch High Schools, won the state championship in 2010.

The men’s baseball team won the 5A state championship in 2021.

The men’s lacrosse team won the 5A state championship in 2021.

The school maintains a rivalry with local ThunderRidge High School in all sports, especially football.

Theatre 
The America High School Theatre Festival has honored Stage Flight Theatre, and the production of Rosencrantz and Guildenstern Are Dead was selected by Colorado Thespians as the Main Stage performance at the 2007 Colorado Thespian Conference.  Stage Flight Theatre also hosted and produced the first ever All-State Colorado Theatre production, The 25th Annual Putnam County Spelling Bee, in 2010.

Notable alumni 

 Jake Pemberton (born 1996), American-Israeli basketball player in the Israeli National League
 Mallory Pugh, women's soccer player and US Olympian (2016 Olympic Games)
 A. J. Schugel, MLB pitcher for the Pittsburgh Pirates

References

External links 
Mountain Vista High School
Douglas County School District

Public high schools in Colorado
Educational institutions established in 2001
Schools in Douglas County, Colorado
2001 establishments in Colorado